Eoophyla stresemanni is a moth in the family Crambidae. It was described by Rothschild in 1915. It is found on Seram Island.

References

Eoophyla
Moths described in 1915